Kåre Kivijärvi (born 23 April 1938 in Hammerfest - 20 November 1991) was a Norwegian photographer known for his photojournalistic work in Northern Norway.

Kivijärvi was born into a Kven family and always professed a connection to his ethnic heritage and to Finland. After working as a photographer's apprentice in Finnmark Dagblad, he was in 1959 accepted at Folkwangschule für Gestaltung in Essen, Germany, where he studied with Otto Steinert. After having served in the Royal Norwegian Air Force as an aerial photographer, he accepted a position as staff photographer for Helsingin Sanomats weekly newsmagazine Viikkosanomat, which brought him on assignment to Greenland, the Soviet Union, Afghanistan, India, and Nepal.

Kivijärvi's work was the first to be accepted by the main annual art exhibition in Norway, the Autumn Exhibition (Høstutstillingen). In this respect, it can be said that he contributed to establish photography as a distinct art form in Norway.

Kivijärvi's photographic style is noted for its stark, sparse imagery. His photo essay on Laestadians in Northern Norway in 1962 is a noted example of this style, as are his depiction of desolate landscapes and harsh climates.

References
 Eli Høydalsnes: Kåre Kivijärvi : fotografier; Bonytt, 2001  
 Flor, Harald "Klokt om Kivijärvi". Dagbladet, 28 December 2001. 
 Løberg, Morten M. "Nordic Light hedrer Kåre Kivijärvi (1931-1991): 'Min verden er en annen'. Fotografi, 24 May 2007.

External links
Poem:"Homage to Kare Kivijarvi" by Scottish writer John Burnside, including "The Inspiration Behind the Poem", published by Scottish Arts Council
Vintage prints: http://www.galleribalder.com/portfolio91752.html

1938 births
1991 deaths
Kven people
Royal Norwegian Air Force personnel
Norwegian photographers
Norwegian photojournalists
People from Hammerfest
Norwegian expatriates in Germany
20th-century Norwegian journalists